Cynthia Lee Harris (August 9, 1934 – October 3, 2021) was an American film, television, and stage actress. She is best known for her roles in the television series Edward & Mrs. Simpson and the sitcom Mad About You.

Life and career
Cynthia Lee Harris was born in New York City in 1934, the daughter of Saul Harris, a haberdasher, and his wife, Deborah. She had two brothers, one of whom predeceased her. Interested in the stage from a young age, she began studying theater at age 12 and graduated from Smith College in 1955 with a degree in theater and literature. 

She joined the Adams Memorial Theatre in Williamstown (in the same state on the campus of another college) where she performed in five summer seasons from 1955 to 1959. She then studied acting with Lee Strasberg at the Actors Studio. Harris also studied with  George Morrison.

Harris appeared in such television series and TV movies, such as Archie Bunker's Place and All My Children. In Edward and Mrs. Simpson, she was cast as the Duchess of Windsor, which earned her a BAFTA Award nomination in 1979. For five seasons, she played "comic yenta mom" Sylvia Buchman on the sitcom Mad About You, a role she reprised in the show's 2019 limited series revival. For almost two decades, she played "Mrs. B." in television advertisements for the now-defunct department store chain Bradlees.

She made her Broadway debut as an understudy for the drama Natural Affection in 1963. In 1971, she appeared on Broadway in the Stephen Sondheim-George Furth musical, Company. In 1978, she received a BAFTA nomination for her performance as Wallis Simpson in Edward & Mrs. Simpson (1978).

Harris was one of the co-artistic directors for the Off-Broadway company The Actors Company Theatre, which she co-founded in 1993. She appeared in numerous plays with the company, including Hoe, Bedroom Farce and Lost in Yonkers, portraying nearly four dozen characters over the course of her tenure with the group. In 2013, Harris appeared as Adriana in the Primary Stages production of The Tribute Artist.

Death
Harris died in New York City on October 3, 2021, at the age of 87. She was survived by her partner, Nathan Silverstein, as well as her brother, Dr. Matthew Harris, and extended family. She had suffered from Type 1 diabetes for much of her life.

Filmography
 Isadora (1968)
 Up the Sandbox (1972)
 I Could Never Have Sex with Any Man Who Has So Little Regard for My Husband (1973)
 The Bob Newhart Show (1975)
 Sirota's Court (1976-1977)
 Edward and Mrs. Simpson (1978)
 Laverne & Shirley  (1978)
 Husbands, Wives & Lovers (1979)
 Three's Company  (1979)
 Hart to Hart (1980)
 Archie Bunker's Place (1981)
 Tempest (1982)
 Quincy, M.E. (1982)
 Reuben, Reuben (1983)
 L.A. Law (1986-1987) - recurring role
 Izzy and Moe (1987)
 Three Men and a Baby (1987)
 Everything's Relative (1987; 1 episode)
 Kate & Allie (1989)
 The Ann Jillian Show (1990)
 Murder, She Wrote (1990; 1 episode)
 Mannequin Two: On the Move (1991)
 Law & Order (1991-1993; 1997)
 The Distinguished Gentleman (1992) 
 Mad About You (1993-1999, 2019) - recurring role
 Murder, She Wrote (1994; 1 episode)
 All My Children (1994; Unknown episodes)
 Now and Again (1999)
 The Geena Davis Show (2000)
 An American Daughter (2000)
 Rescue Me (2004-2007)

References

External links
 
 Cynthia Harris @ broadwayworld.com
 Cynthia Harris @IBDB.com
 

1934 births
2021 deaths
American film actresses
American stage actresses
American television actresses
Actresses from New York City
Deaths from diabetes
Smith College alumni
21st-century American women